Oh Lawd may refer to:

"Oh Lawd", a song by Zion I from Mind over Matter (2000)
"Oh Lawd", a song by Stylo G (2020)